Tompkins Township may refer to the following places in the United States:

 Tompkins Township, Warren County, Illinois
 Tompkins Township, Jackson County, Michigan

See also

Tompkins (disambiguation)

Township name disambiguation pages